Nikolai Nikolayevich Svezhintsev (born 7 July 1983) is a former Russian professional footballer.

Club career
He played in the Russian Football National League for FC Baltika Kaliningrad in 2004.

Honors
 Belarusian Premier League bronze: 2003.

References

External links
 

1983 births
People from Valuyki, Belgorod Oblast
Living people
Russian footballers
Association football defenders
FC Spartak Moscow players
FC Dinamo Minsk players
FC Baltika Kaliningrad players
FC Oryol players
FC Mostransgaz Gazoprovod players
Kapaz PFK players
FC Lukhovitsy players
Belarusian Premier League players
Azerbaijan Premier League players
Russian expatriate footballers
Expatriate footballers in Belarus
Expatriate footballers in Azerbaijan
Sportspeople from Belgorod Oblast